Directions is a compilation album by American jazz musician Miles Davis, released in 1981 by Columbia Records. It collects previously unreleased outtakes that Davis recorded between 1960 and 1970. Directions was the last of a series of compilation albums - mostly consisting of, at that time, previously unreleased music - that Columbia released to bridge Davis' recording hiatus that ended with The Man with the Horn in July 1981.

Music 
Directions is a double album that features previously unreleased outtakes recorded over a 10-year period by Davis. Apart from "Song of Our Country" from the recording sessions for Sketches of Spain (1960), a 1961 recording of "'Round Midnight", and "So Near, So Far" from 1963, the album's songs are from Davis' transitional period during 1967 to 1970, when he was experimenting with a fusion of jazz and rock. They feature sidemen such as saxophonist Wayne Shorter, guitarist John McLaughlin, and keyboardists Herbie Hancock, Joe Zawinul, and Chick Corea.

Critical reception 

Reviewing in Allmusic, critic Scott Yanow believed some of the tracks "rambled on a bit too long" but the music was nonetheless "mostly quite fascinating" and "highly recommendable to collectors with an open ear toward fusion."

Track listing
All tracks by Miles Davis except where noted.

Personnel

"Song of Our Country", recorded in New York, March 11, 1960. (Reissued on 1997 CD release of Sketches of Spain.)
 Miles Davis – trumpet, flugelhorn
 Gil Evans – arranger, conductor
 Johnny Coles, Bernie Glow, Ernie Royal – trumpet
 James Buffington, Tony Miranda, Joe Singer – French horn
 Frank Rehak, Dick Hixon – trombone
 Bill Barber – tuba
 Albert Block, Harold Feldman – flute
 Danny Bank – clarinet
 Jack Knitzer – bassoon
 Romeo Penque – oboe
 Janet Putnam – harp
 Paul Chambers – bass
 Jimmy Cobb – drums
 Elvin Jones – percussion

"'Round Midnight", recorded live at "The Blackhawk" in San Francisco, April 22, 1961. (Reissued on 2003 CD release of In Person Friday and Saturday Nights at the Blackhawk, Complete)
 Miles Davis – trumpet
 Hank Mobley – tenor saxophone
 Wynton Kelly – piano
 Paul Chambers – bass
 Jimmy Cobb – drums

"So Near, So Far", recorded in Hollywood, Ca., April 16, 1963. (Reissued on the first CD of the 2004 box set Seven Steps: The Complete Columbia Recordings of Miles Davis 1963–1964, as well as on the 2005 CD re-release of Seven Steps to Heaven.) 
 Miles Davis – trumpet
 George Coleman – tenor saxophone
 Victor Feldman – piano
 Ron Carter – bass
 Frank Butler – drums

"Limbo", recorded in Hollywood, Ca., May 9, 1967. (Reissued on the 1998 CD re-release of Sorcerer, as well as on the second CD of 1998 box set release The Complete Studio Recordings of The Miles Davis Quintet 1965–1968)
 Miles Davis – trumpet
 Wayne Shorter – tenor saxophone
 Herbie Hancock – piano
 Buster Williams; bass
 Tony Williams – drums

"Water on the Pond", recorded in New York, December 28, 1967. (Reissued on the fourth CD of the 1998 box set release Miles Davis Quintet 1965–'68)
 Miles Davis – trumpet
 Wayne Shorter – tenor saxophone
 Herbie Hancock – Wurlitzer electric piano
 Joe Beck – guitar
 Ron Carter – bass
 Tony Williams – drums

"Fun", recorded in New York, January 11, 1968. (Reissued on the fourth CD of the 1998 box set release Miles Davis Quintet 1965–'68)
 Miles Davis – trumpet
 Wayne Shorter – tenor saxophone
 Herbie Hancock – Wurlitzer electric piano
 Bucky Pizzarelli – electric guitar 
 Ron Carter – bass
 Tony Williams – drums

"Directions I & II" and "Ascent", recorded in New York, November 27, 1968. (All three tracks were reissued on the second CD of the 2001 box set release of The Complete In a Silent Way Sessions)
 Miles Davis – trumpet
 Wayne Shorter – soprano saxophone
 Herbie Hancock, Chick Corea – electric piano
 Joe Zawinul – organ
 Dave Holland – double bass
 Jack DeJohnette – drums

"Duran", recorded in New York, March 17, 1970. (Reissued as "Duran (Take 6)" on the second CD of 2003 box set release The Complete Jack Johnson Sessions)
 Miles Davis – trumpet
 Wayne Shorter – soprano saxophone
 Bennie Maupin – bass clarinet
 John McLaughlin – electric guitar
 Dave Holland – electric bass
 Billy Cobham – drums

"Konda", recorded in New York, May 21, 1970. (The unedited version of the track was issued on disc 4 of the 2003 box set release The Complete Jack Johnson Sessions.)
 Miles Davis – trumpet
 Keith Jarrett – electric piano
 John McLaughlin – electric guitar
 Airto Moreira – percussion

"Willie Nelson", recorded in New York, February 27, 1970. (Reissued on the first CD of the 2003 box set release The Complete Jack Johnson Sessions)
 Miles Davis – trumpet
 Steve Grossman – soprano saxophone
 John McLaughlin – electric guitar
 Dave Holland – electric bass
 Jack DeJohnette – drums

References

Bibliography

External links 
 
 Directions on Jazzdisco.org

1981 compilation albums
Miles Davis compilation albums
Albums produced by Teo Macero
Columbia Records compilation albums
Legacy Recordings compilation albums
Albums recorded at CBS 30th Street Studio